Raajneeti is a 2010 Indian Hindi-language political thriller film co-written, directed and produced by Prakash Jha, with a screenplay by Anjum Rajabali and Prakash Jha. The film depicts an archetypal conflict between rival political families and parties, based on Mahabharata. The film starred an ensemble cast of Ajay Devgn, Nana Patekar, Ranbir Kapoor, Katrina Kaif, Arjun Rampal, Manoj Bajpayee, Sarah Thompson and Naseeruddin Shah. It was originally produced by Prakash Jha Productions and distributed by UTV Motion Pictures and Walkwater Media. 

It was shot in Bhopal. The title, which translates literally as "Politics" and contextually as "Affairs of State", was promoted with the tag-line "Politics and Beyond..."

Amid much controversy, Raajneeti released in theatres worldwide on 4 June 2010,  It received mixed-to-positive reviews from critics both in India and internationally, received acclaim for acting performances and direction. It became a major commercial success, grossing over  worldwide, and was one of the highest-grossing Indian films of 2010.

At the 56th Filmfare Awards, Raajneeti received 4 nominations – Best Actor (Kapoor) and Best Supporting Actor for Rampal, Bajpayee and Patekar.

Plot 

Bharti Rai, the daughter of Ramnath Rai, an eminent politician, is influenced by rival leftist leader Bhaskar Sanyal. She bears an illicit son from Bhaskar, who is abandoned in a boat by Brij Gopal, Bharti's 'rakhi' brother. Bharti is later married to Chandra Pratap, the younger brother of Bhanu Pratap, who leads the Rashtrawadi party.

The minority state government collapses, when Rashtrawadi party withdraws its support. On his birthday gathering, Bhanu Pratap suffers a stroke and hands over power to his younger brother Chandra Pratap. Chandra's elder son, Prithvi Pratap tries to take advantage of his father's power and starts to impose his own decisions on the party, which results in a clash with his miffed cousin, Veerendra Pratap. Chandra Pratap begins to sideline Veerendra. For the upcoming mid-term polls, Prithvi rejects the nomination of a kabaddi champion and local leader Sooraj Kumar, who is chosen by the common people. However, Sooraj gets Veerendra's support to join the Central Committee of the party. Unknown to all, Sooraj is Bharti's abandoned son, who was found and brought up by the Pratap family's driver Ram Charittra and his wife. When Sooraj demands a candidacy in the elections, Brij Gopal shrewdly nominates his father Ramcharitra from the same seat. Meanwhile, Chandra Pratap's younger son, Samar Pratap, returns from the United States and meets his childhood friend Indu, who loves him. She proposes to him, but he declines.

In order to regain his power within the party and be the chief-ministerial candidate in the state assembly election, Veerendra, with Sooraj's help, has Chandra Pratap assassinated. In an ensuing drama, Prithvi is arrested. SP Sharma, under Veerendra's influence, press rape charges against Prithvi Pratap. In order to bail him out, Samar Pratap promises Veerendra of Prithvi's resignation from the party. However, Samar and Prithvi begin rallying public support. The bed-ridden Bhanu Pratap officially expels Prithvi, who forms the new Jana Shakti party, with Brij Gopal as his mentor and Samar as the executive. To raise funds for the new party from Indu's industrialist father, Samar shrewdly ensures Prithvi's marriage to Indu, against her will. Meanwhile, Samar's American girlfriend Sarah arrives in India to meet him.

The battle gets murkier with both sides trying every trick to ensure their victory. Allegations and counter-allegations are made. Subsequently, Samar blackmails and kills Babulal, an old party associate of Bhanu Pratap, after uncovering from him that Sooraj and Veerendra had murdered his father Chandra Pratap. On the other hand, Prithvi kills SP Sharma and a party worker. Meanwhile, Indu slowly falls in love with Prithvi who has been nice and respectful towards her. Sarah realizes that the two brothers are committing political murders, and decide to return to the US, pregnant. Veerendra and Sooraj plan to assassinate Samar by planting a bomb in his car, but it is Prithvi and Sarah who perish in the explosion. Braj Gopal confronts Ramcharitra for Sooraj's misdeeds, when Sooraj is revealed to be the first child of Bharti.

Devastated by the loss of his brother and girlfriend, Samar decides to retaliate. He suggests Indu take the reins of the party and arranges the election campaign single-handedly. Bharti implores Sooraj to join his younger brother Samar. However, Sooraj refuses to part ways with Veerendra who has always supported him. Exit polls predict a victory for Indu's party. On the counting day, Samar lures Veerendra and Sooraj to an unused factory by spreading a rumour. They fall into the trap, and Veerendra gets shot by Samar and his men. Sooraj gets an opportunity to shoot Samar, but cannot bring himself to do it since he knows Samar is his brother. Sooraj requests Samar to spare him and Veerendra till they reach the hospital, but Veerendra dies on the way. Gopal prompts Samar to shoot Sooraj who questions the morality of the act, but Brij Gopal convinces him to take revenge for the destruction of his family. Samar, not aware of his relationship with Sooraj, shoots him.

The election results are declared. Jan Shakti Party emerges with a majority and Indu becomes the CM. Samar and Indu mend their differences. Indu is pregnant with Prithvi's child, while Samar leaves India to look after Sarah's mother.

Cast 

 Ajay Devgn as Sooraj Kumar:  a local leader, the biological son of Bhaskar Sanyal and Bharti Pratap and the friend of Virendra Pratap
 Nana Patekar as Brij Gopal: the god-son of Ramnath Rai, the brother of Bharti Pratap and the mentor of Prithviraj Pratap when he founds the Jana Shakti party
 Ranbir Kapoor as Samar Pratap: the younger son of Chandra Pratap and the Executive of the Jana Shakti party
 Katrina Kaif as Indu Pratap ( Seksaria): the Chief Minister of Madhya Pradesh, who initially loved Samar, but was married to Prithviraj Pratap
 Arjun Rampal as Prithviraj Pratap: the founder of the Jana Shakti party, the elder son of Chandra Pratap and the brother of Samar Pratap
 Manoj Bajpayee as Veerendra Pratap: the chief ministerial candidate from the Rashtrawadi party, the son of Bhanu Pratap and the main antagonist
 Sarah Thompson as Sarah Jean Collins: the girlfriend of Samar Pratap
 Naseeruddin Shah as Bhaskar Sanyal: a leftist leader who opposed the government of Ramnath Rai
 Darshan Jariwala as Ramnath Rai: the former Chief Minister, the father of Bharti Pratap and the godfather of Brij Gopal
 Chetan Pandit as Chandra Pratap: the younger brother of Bhanu Pratap and the father of Prithviraj Pratap and Samar Pratap, he leads the party for a while after his brother suffers a heart attack
 Shruti Seth as a party worker
 Nikhila Trikha as Bharti Pratap: the daughter of Ramnath Rai, the 'rakhi' sister of Brij Gopal, the wife of Chandra Pratap and the former associate of Bhaskar Sanyal
 Vinay Apte as Babulal 
 Kiran Karmarkar as Sharma, an SP loyal to Veerendra Pratap
 Dayashankar Pandey as Ram Charittra
 Khan Jahangir Khan as Bhanu Pratap: the President of the Rashtrawadi party and the elder brother of Chandra Pratap
 Ravi Khemu as Ramkumar Sakseria: Indu’s father
 Barkha Bisht as item number "Ishq Barse"

Reception

Critical reception 
Mayank Shekhar of Hindustan Times rated it 3/5 and criticized saying, "There's a reason Mahabharat was a television series. Shyam Benegal could brilliantly adapt it around India’s corporate boardroom, only for his contained minimalism (Kalyug, 1981). What you sense here instead then is an over-dramatic, over-written screenplay: an over-boiled egg." He said that the sub-plots of various characters have an awkward conclusions. He compared Jha's earlier films Gangaajal (2003) and Apaharan (2005) and remarked that they are "finely focused works" in comparison to Raajneeti. Nikhat Kazmi of The Times of India rated it 4/5 and said, "The film basically anchors its plot in two classic tales — The Mahabharata and The Godfather (1972) — to create an engrossing diatribe on India's political system where democracy may prevail, but not in its purest form." Anupama Chopra of NDTV rated it 3/5 and said "Jha creates a real sense of the machinations and sordid deals that fuel politics but then hobbles it with outlandish twists and some decidedly 'filmy' moments".

Rajeev Masand of CNN-IBN rated it 3.5/5 and said, "In the end, Raajneeti is thrilling and gripping for the most part, even though it does lose steam in its final act. And as far as politics goes, it doesn't tell you very much more than you didn't already know." He continued, "For the superb acting, and for the exciting dramatic highs, it's a film I recommend you do not miss." Raja Sen of Rediff.com gave a 1.5 out of 5 star rating explaining that it is "essentially Sarkar Raj (2008) minus Amitabh Bachchan, is a hyperactive drama given to much yelling and little thought. The screenplay is weak, manipulative and every possible kind of lazy, with an omniscient narrator who vanishes after a while, a slew of unbelievably one-note characters, clunky dialogue that often lapses into something from period cinema, and bloody deaths thrown in every few scenes to kickstart the drama in this exhausting 3-hour film."

Rachel Saltz of The New York Times said, "Raajneeti, with its large cast of characters and wealth of subplots, is often a mess, but an interesting one." She also said, "The film – full of romance, intrigue and fraternal strife – is too diffuse to score political points. Or to have much impact." Robert Abele of the Los Angeles Times found that while it aimed "for something trenchant about thwarted destiny and ugly ambition in modern Indian democracy", it "mostly winds up with a convoluted and tonally awkward Godfather rehash, with nary a character worth rooting for" and that "Kapoor's performance is stony rather than calculating...." Frank Lovece of Film Journal International said, "More pulpy than political, this Godfather-ripoff Hindi electoral drama is a candidate for oblivion in U.S. theatres. ... It all eventually becomes so ridiculous and over-the-top violent that there is nobody, nobody, to root for."

Box office 
Rajneeti grossed  worldwide and was declared a blockbuster at the box office.

India 
Raajneeti recorded an opening of nearly  10 crore net on its first day. It had the second highest Friday opening in India after 3 Idiots and the highest Friday opening in the first half of the year, surpassing Kites. It collected  34 crore at the end of the weekend and set a record for biggest weekend in the first half of the year, surpassing Housefull. It showed no major decline in business on Tuesday and collected Rs. 5.85 crore. At the end of the first week, the film collected Rs. 54.75 crore and set a record for biggest week in the first half of the year beating Housefull. Raajneeti sustained well in the second weekend and collected  16.25 crore. It was the tenth highest grossing Bollywood film until it was surpassed by Salman Khan starrer Kick. It was declared a blockbuster.

Overseas 
Overseas, the film opened to weekend business of $2.25 million. In the U.S., Raajneeti played well for a limited release, noted Ray Subers of BoxOfficeMojo.com, grossing $850,244 on 124 screens its opening weekend, "which was good for first among limited releases and 11th place on the overall weekend chart." He specified that Raajneeti "became the third Bollywood movie this year to lead all limited releases in its first weekend," following My Name is Khan and Kites. In Australia and New Zealand, Raajneeti surpassed the opening weekend record set by 3 Idiots.

Awards and nominations

56th Filmfare Awards

Nominated 
Best Actor – Ranbir Kapoor
Best Supporting Actor – Arjun Rampal
Best Supporting Actor – Manoj Bajpai
Best Supporting Actor – Nana Patekar

12th IIFA Awards

Won 
 Best Supporting Actor – Arjun Rampal

Nominated 
 Best Film – Raajneeti
 Best Actor – Ranbir Kapoor
 Best Actress – Katrina Kaif
 Best Supporting Actor – Manoj Bajpayee

17th Annual Star Screen Awards 2011

Won
Best Actress (Popular Choice) – Katrina Kaif
Best Screenplay – Prakash Jha, Anjum Rajabali
Best Background Music – Wayne Sharp

Nominated
Best Actor – Ranbir Kapoor
Best Supporting Actor – Nana Patekar
Best Villain – Manoj Bajpayee

6th Apsara Film & Television Producers Guild Awards(2010) 
Won
 Best Supporting Actor – Arjun Rampal

Nominated
 Best Film – Prakash Jha
 Best Actor – Ranbir Kapoor
 Best Supporting Actor – Ajay Devgn
 Best Villain – Manoj Bajpai
 Best Lyricist – Sameer for "Mora Piya"
 Best Male Playback Singer – Aadesh Shrivastava (for "Mora Piya")
 Best Story – Prakash Jha
 Best Screenplay – Anjum Rajabali & Prakash Jha
 Best Dialogue – Prakash Jha

2011 Zee Cine Awards 
Won
Best Supporting Actor – Arjun Rampal

Nominated
Best Film
Best Actor – Ranbir Kapoor
Best Actress – Katrina Kaif

3rd Mirchi Music Awards 
Nominated
Male Vocalist of The Year – Aadesh Shrivastava (for "Mora Piya")
Upcoming Female Vocalist of The Year – Antara Mitra (for "Bheegi Si Bhaagi Si")
Song representing Sufi tradition – "Mora Piya"
 Best Programmer & Arranger of the Year – Amar Makwana, Mani Iyer and Sandeep Chatterjie (for "Mora Piya")
Best Background Score of the Year – Wayne Sharpe

Controversy 
Raajneeti was first denied a certificate by the censor board of India for their thought that the lead character played by Katrina Kaif is inspired fully or partially by the Congress Party's chief Sonia Gandhi and Rashtriya Janata Dal's chief Rabri Devi. Director Prakash Jha dismissed this allegation, saying his only inspiration was Mahabharata, an epic from ancient India. References to electronic voting machines and parts of the film suggesting that women have to compromise to get ahead in politics, crude dialogues about the Muslim community and some intimate scenes and excessive violence were removed before giving the film a U/A censor certificate.

Soundtrack

The score was composed by Wayne Sharpe while the soundtrack was composed by Wayne Sharpe, Pritam, Aadesh Shrivastava and Shantanu Moitra. The lyrics were written by Irshad Kamil, Gulzar, Sameer and Swanand Kirkire. The soundtrack consists of five original songs and four remixes. It was released on 14 May 2010. The songs "Mora Piya" and "Bheegi Si Bhaagi Si" went on to be chartbusters of 2010.

Track list

References

External links 
 
 
 
 

2010 films
2010s Hindi-language films
Indian political thriller films
2010s political thriller films
Films directed by Prakash Jha
Films set in India
Films based on the Mahabharata
Films featuring songs by Pritam
Films scored by Shantanu Moitra
Films scored by Aadesh Shrivastava
2010 soundtrack albums
Films shot in Madhya Pradesh
UTV Motion Pictures films
Indian crime thriller films
2010 crime thriller films